Riceberry  is a rice variety from Thailand, a cross-breed of Jao Hom Nin (JHN, a local non-glutinous purple rice) and Khao Dawk Mali 105 (Hom Mali rice). The variety was created in 2002 by the Rice Science Center, Kasetsart University, Kamphaeng Saen Campus, Nakhon Pathom, Thailand. The outcome is a soft, deep purple whole grain rice. Riceberry has been used as a substitute for brown rice. In 2005, it was approved for mass cultivation and consumption.

Riceberry is grown primarily in northern and northeastern Thailand. The wet season months of August through December are suitable for riceberry planting.

Riceberry is distinct from traditional black rice.

Characteristics

Nutritional properties 
Riceberry is enriched with both water-soluble—mainly anthocyanin—and lipid soluble antioxidants, such as carotenoid, gamma oryzanol, and vitamin E. The nutritional properties of riceberry are concentrated in its bran, with only a small fraction in its endosperm. This is true of all cereals, meaning that it is best to consume whole, rather than polished, grains.

Riceberry has a "medium" glycemic index (GI=62).

Governmental support
The Commerce Ministry aims to increase riceberry cultivation from 5,000 rai to 20,000 rai (3,200 hectares) by 2018 to address in the world market demand for organic brown rice. The yield from 5,000 rai amounts to only 1,500 tonnes. Demand for premium organic rice is still small, accounting for only one to two percent of total rice exports, but as riceberry sells for two or three times the price of white rice, it has the potential to increase farming incomes.  Riceberry sold in the domestic market for about 50 baht a kilogram, while the export price was 200 baht per kilogram.

References 

Rice varieties
Agriculture in Thailand